Dev Singh Gill is an Indian actor and model known for his work in Telugu, Tamil and Kannada movies alongside Hindi and Punjabi movies.

Career 
Gill made his debut with film Shaheed-E-Azam (2002). In 2008, he acted in Telugu language film Krishnarjuna. In 2009 he appeared in Magadheera (2009), which received positive reviews from the critics upon its release. He played the villain in the Tamil movie Sura (2010. Gill played the role of an actor in Prema Kavali (2011).  In 2013 he played the role of Pakistani athlete Abdul Khaliq in Bhaag Milkha Bhaag. In 2014 He worked in Rajinikanth starrer Lingaa (2014). He played a lead role in Punjabi language film Saadey CM Saab (2016).

Filmography

References

External links 
 
 

Living people
Indian male film actors
Male actors from Pune
1977 births